Taryn Heather (born 31 August 1982) is an Australian racing cyclist. She rode at the 2014 UCI Road World Championships.

Major results

2011
 2nd Time trial, National Road Championships
 4th Time trial, Oceania Road Championships
 6th Memorial Davide Fardelli
 8th Overall Tour de Feminin-O cenu Českého Švýcarska
2012
 2nd Time trial, National Road Championships
 3rd Overall Women's Tour of New Zealand
 10th Chrono Champenois
2013
 1st  Time trial, Oceania Road Championships
 6th Overall Tour de Feminin-O cenu Českého Švýcarska
 7th Chrono Champenois – Trophée Européen
2014
 3rd Nagrada Ljubljane TT
 10th Overall Auensteiner–Radsporttage
2015
 3rd Time trial, National Road Championships
 6th Time trial, Oceania Road Championships
2019
 8th Overall Women's Tour Down Under
 1st Peaks Challenge Falls Creek

References

External links

1982 births
Living people
Australian female cyclists
Place of birth missing (living people)